Leptocometes zikani is a species of beetle in the family Cerambycidae. It was described by Martins and Monné in 1974.

References

Leptocometes
Beetles described in 1974